Con Man is an American comedy web series created, written, directed by, and starring Alan Tudyk. The series follows cult science fiction actor Wray Nerely (Tudyk), as he tours the convention circuit. Tudyk, one of the stars of the 2002 science fiction TV show Firefly, based Con Man loosely upon his own experiences. The series is co-produced by PJ Haarsma and by Nathan Fillion, who also co-stars in it. Crowdfunded through Indiegogo, Con Man set records for crowdfunding a web series by raising more than $1 million in 24 hours and more than $3.1 million overall.

The series premiered on September 30, 2015, on Vimeo, with the first season consisting of 13 episodes. The second season premiered on December 8, 2016 on Comic-Con HQ, Comic-Con's subscription streaming video service and consisted of 12 episodes. In 2017, the series was acquired by Syfy and had its television debut on September 9, 2017, where the episodes were combined to produce half-hour installments for airing.

Plot 
Wray Nerely (Tudyk) is a struggling actor who starred as a spaceship pilot on Spectrum, a canceled science fiction series that went on to become a cult classic. Wray's good friend Jack Moore (Nathan Fillion), who starred as the ship's captain, has become an A-list movie star.  Frustrated by Jack's success and his lack thereof, Wray travels the science fiction convention circuit, makes appearances at comic book stores, and visits pop culture events. He navigates the odd people and incidents he encounters along the way while learning to love the fans he has.

Cast

Main cast 
 Alan Tudyk as Wray Nerely, a struggling actor who formerly starred on Spectrum as pilot Cash Wayne. To his dissatisfaction, he is pigeonholed into science fiction roles, the only non–science fiction role being an episode of Justified. Tudyk said of his character, "Wray struggles with his career and he's very unhappy in his career. Even though he's a huge star at conventions, he comes home to his one-bedroom apartment and hopes to get a guest star spot on NCIS: Topeka." Wray's former role as a pilot on a canceled science fiction show and later cult hit is a nod to Tudyk's role on Firefly.
 Nathan Fillion as Jack Moore, Wray's good friend who formerly starred on Spectrum as Captain James Raaker. Unlike Wray, Jack has "gone on to incredible action-hero stardom, like Matt Damon" and so "is a daily reminder of what Wray wishes he had". Tudyk said of Fillion's involvement, "Nathan was an obvious choice for this project from the beginning. I’ve wanted to work with him again since Firefly, really." Jack's former role as a captain on a canceled science fiction show and later cult hit is a nod to Fillion's role on Firefly.
 Mindy Sterling as Bobbie, Wray's booking agent. She receives fifteen percent of everything Wray receives, and to increase this amount, she downgrades Wray's flights and accommodations so the convention will pay him the difference in cash. Though it is observed she is not conventionally attractive, she often has sex with convention guests. She was formerly an actress and, though is not famous, has a varied filmography ranging from a science fiction B movie to snuff films. Tudyk stated Bobbie is his favorite character and said she "represents the 'carnie' aspect of the conventions".

Recurring cast 
Of the "kooky" people who populate the series, Tudyk emphasized, "the kooky people in Con Man are not the fans. [The fans] are the heroes of this. The kooky people are the people who work in the conventions. [...] It's the people that we've met along the way that are pulling the strings behind the curtain, in addition to kooky celebrities."
 Casper Van Dien as John Boutell, the bartender at every bar, regardless of its location.
 Sean Astin as himself, an actor who played Samwise Gamgee in The Lord of the Rings film series. While he advises Wray to accept his status as a beloved cult icon and gladly interacts with his fans, he also encourages Wray to use the fans' devotion for material gain, such as to upgrade his flight from coach to first class.
 Ari Stidham as 1st class fan, a Spectrum fan. He reneges on an agreement to give his first-class plane seat to Wray if Wray signs multiple items, causing Wray to later refuse to return the fan's "lucky pen". The fan reveals this during a panel, foiling Wray's attempt to calm the enraged audience. He is among those who chase Wray.
 Felicia Day as Karen, Wray's enthusiastic assistant for the duration of the convention he attends in episodes two through four. She always dresses exactly as he does in case she needs to be his decoy, and because of this, he is able to escape an enraged group of fans.
 Nolan North as Jerry Lansing, a motion capture artist, second best after Andy Serkis, and self-proclaimed "mocap king". He reappears in "Voiced Over" recording voice-over work for a video game. The character was originally named Nigel Thrice; Jerry Lansing was a character originally created by North while he worked on the Uncharted series.
 Tricia Helfer as Louise, a woman attending a doll convention who treats her baby dolls as if they are real infants. Though Wray finds this behavior creepy, he becomes enamored with her and strives to gain her affection. Their short-lived relationship ends when Wray breaks her porcelain doll Isabelle in "Doll Faced".
 Leslie Jordan as himself, an actor. Though he is widely believed to be gay, he admits to Wray that he is pretending so that he can attract older politically conservative women through the "corrosive black lie" that sexuality is a choice. He becomes enamored with Bobbie, especially after she convinces him she is conservative.
 Sean Maher as himself, a gay actor who starred in the Firefly television series and the related film Serenity. He mistakenly believes Bobbie is male, then interprets Wray's correction as she is transgender, and becomes enamored with her and how "courageous" he perceives her to be.
 Alison Haislip as Faith, Jack Moore's new assistant who oversees his day to day schedule. As a fan of the original series Spectrum, she starts a flirty relationship with Wray although someone or something always seems to come between them.
 Liza Lapira as Brenda, an actress who played Dr. Chu on Spectrum.
 Henry Rollins as Stutter, an actor who played Hashen on Spectrum.
 Skyler Day as Tiffany, an actress who played Ketheria on Spectrum.
 Skylar Haarsma as Young Tiffany, during the time Spectrum was on the air.
 Amy Acker as Dawn, an actress who played Bree on Spectrum.

Episodes

Season 1 (2015)

Season 2 (2016–17)

Production

Conception and development 
Tudyk developed the series based on his experiences as an actor touring the science fiction convention circuit. Though it is not autobiographical, the fictional Spectrum echoes Firefly, a canceled science fiction series-turned-cult hit that starred Tudyk as a pilot and Fillion as a captain, and Wray's experiences draw heavily on incidents and people Tudyk and Fillion encountered at conventions. Spectrum is based on a prequel novel to The Softwire series currently being written by PJ Haarsma, who is also a producer of Con Man.

Tudyk said in March 2015 that the concept had been in development for two years. He pitched the idea to a production company, which became interested in producing the series and began to draw up contracts. However, the company's funder left the company, and the series was dropped. Tudyk spent a year meeting with producers but was disappointed. When asked to find an audience beyond "weird convention nerds," he refused, believing it to be compromising the concept of Con Man and disrespecting fans.

The series premiered on September 30, 2015, on Vimeo, with the first season consisting of 13 episodes. The second season premiered on December 8, 2016 on Comic-Con HQ, Comic-Con's subscription streaming video service, consisted of 12 episodes, and concluded on January 26, 2017.

In July 2017, the series was acquired by Syfy and had its television debut on September 9, 2017. The web series was shown as is but the episodes were combined to produce half-hour installments for airing, with all thirteen episodes of the first season aired back-to-back on the night. If the reception of the television network broadcast goes well and viewer ratings are sufficient, the network may decide to fund future seasons.

Crowdfunding campaign 
On March 10, 2015, Tudyk, Fillion, and Haarsma launched a campaign to raise funds for the series on crowdfunding website Indiegogo with a target goal of $425,000 to produce three ten-minute episodes. In 24 hours, the campaign raised over $1 million, setting a one-day record for a crowdfunded web series. In 35 hours, it raised over $1.4 million, breaking the overall web series crowdfunding record set by the campaign for TableTops Season Three. The campaign set a stretch goal of $1.75 million to produce a full season of 12 episodes, as Tudyk planned, plus a "lost" episode of the fictional Spectrum. The goal was met on March 14, 2015. The campaign closed on April 10, 2015 with $3,124,214.

The decision to use crowdfunding came out of Tudyk and Fillion's desire to work with people who knew the world of conventions, would enjoy being involved, and did not disrespect fans and their world. Tudyk said, "It's something that just made sense. This world of Cons, of the sci-fi conventions, is built by the fans." Fillion said, "This project in the hands of the fans is the only place it will be safe."

Casting 
The launch of crowdfunding campaign announced that it would be drawing from talent in science fiction and named several guest stars: Seth Green, Felicia Day, James Gunn, Gina Torres, Sean Maher, and Amy Acker. Later, Tricia Helfer, Michael Trucco, Nolan North, Emily Kinney, Robert Patrick, Mindy Sterling, and Samantha Smith were announced as cast members. However, Kinney later left the project because filming dates conflicted with her musical tour. Though the crew thought they would be "begging for favors" to cast the series, the successful Indiegogo campaign attracted interest from actors, including William Shatner, and the crew was surprised by the willingness to take small parts. Fillion noted, "We ran out of parts before we ran out of people for the parts." Tudyk stated that some actors appear as fictionalized versions of themselves because "they are a part of that world." In June 2016, it was announced that Eliza Dushku had been cast for the second season.

Filming 
Principal photography for the first season ran over a 23-day period from June 1 to 30, 2015, in Los Angeles. The set was located at Laurel Canyon Stages in Arleta, Los Angeles. Some crowd scenes were shot at MegaCon 2015 in Orlando, Florida on April 10. Some scenes were shot at Long Beach Convention and Entertainment Center in Los Angeles, California between June 16 and 19, 2015.

Awards 
The series received two 2017 Emmy Award nominations: Alan Tudyk for Outstanding Actor in a Short Form Comedy or Drama Series and Mindy Sterling for Outstanding Actress in a Short Form Comedy or Drama Series.

Notes

References

External links 
 
 
 Con Man on Indiegogo
 Con Man on SyFy

American comedy web series
Crowdfunded web series
2015 web series debuts